Victoria Dock, in Hobart, Tasmania, Australia, is a key dock for Australian Antarctic supply vessels and one of the oldest docks in Tasmania.

History
Victoria Dock was built in 1891. It is the home dock of most of Tasmanian fishing commercial boats which ply their trade along the state's coasts. Reference Page 373 Book by R.J. Sullivan "Urbanisation".

Location in Hobart
Victoria Dock is located on the waterfront of Hobart at harbour side docks on the Derwent River. The dock is adjacent to other Hobart landmark areas such as Constitution Dock, Port Tower Building, Salamanca Place, Battery Point, and forms part of the foreshore of Sullivans Cove.

Restaurants
Victoria Dock also has restaurants which sell fresh seafood caught by local fishermen.

See also
 Constitution Dock

References

External links

 Hobart Port Info
 Tasmanian Ports Corporation

Landmarks in Hobart
Transport in Hobart
Buildings and structures in Hobart
Port of Hobart
Tasmanian Heritage Register